The following is a list of Romanian composers.

 Tiberiu Olah (1928-2002), composer, teacher and musicologist
 Liana Alexandra (1947–2011), neoromantic composer and pianist
 Elena Asachi (1789–1877), Austrian-born Romanian composer, pianist, and singer
 Nicolas Astrinidis (1921–2010), composer who settled and worked in Greece
 Anton Pann (1796-1854), composer, folklorist, orthodox chanter
 Dimitrie Cantemir (1673-1823), composer, historian, writer, folklorist
 Esmeralda Athanasiu-Gardeev (1834–1917), composer and pianist
 Ana-Maria Avram (1961–2017), spectral music composer
 Maya Badian (1945–), Romanian-born Canadian composer and musicologist
 Filaret Barbu (1903–1984), composer, known for the operetta Ana Lugojana
 Pascal Bentoiu (1927–2016), Modernist composer
 Tiberiu Brediceanu (1877–1968), composer and folklorist
 Nicolae Bretan (1887–1968), opera composer, also baritone, conductor and critic
 Eduard Caudella (1841–1924), composer, wrote the first Romanian opera, Petru Rareș
 Sergiu Celibidache (1912–1996), composer and conductor
 Maia Ciobanu (1952–)
 Paul Constantinescu (1909–1963), composer, especially of religious and vocal music, also wrote music for Romanian films
 Vladimir Cosma (born 1940), composer, conductor and violinist
 Dimitrie Cuclin (1885–1978), classical music composer, musicologist, philosopher, translator and writer
 Constantin Dimitrescu (1847–1928), composer of Peasant Dance
 Violeta Dinescu (1953–), composer and pianist
 Grigoraș Dinicu (1889–1949), composer best known for his violin showpiece Hora staccato
 Felicia Donceanu (1931–), composer best known for chamber works, painter, and sculptor
 Sabin Drăgoi (1894–1968), composer and folklorist, one of the pioneers of scientific gathering of Romanian folklore
 Iancu Dumitrescu (1944–), avant-garde music composer
 George Enescu (1881–1955), composer, violinist, pianist, conductor and teacher
 Valentin Gheorghiu (1928–), pianist and composer
 Irina Olga Hasnaş (1954–)
 Philip Herschkowitz (1906–1989), Romanian-born American composer
 Ion Ivanovici (1845–1902), composer of The Danube Waves waltz
 Mihail Jora (1891–1971), "the father of Romanian ballet"; works include Intoarcerea din adâncuri and La piață
 Nicolae Kirculescu (1903–1985), composer of theatre and film music, including the theme of the television programme Teleenciclopedia
 Dumitru Georgescu Kiriac (1866–1928)
 Sorin Lerescu (1953–)
 Sammy Lerner (1903–1989), Romanian-born American composer
 György Ligeti (1923–2006), Transylvanian-born Hungarian and Austrian composer
 Dinu Lipatti (1917–1950), pianist and composer
 Myriam Marbe (1931–1997), composer and pianist
 Cristian Matei (1977–)
 Marcel Mihalovici (1898–1985)
 Teo Milea (1982–), pianist and composer
 Gavriil Musicescu (1847–1903), composer, conductor and musicologist
 Octavian Nemescu (1940–)
 Ştefan Niculescu (1927–2008), composer and professor
 Irina Odăgescu (1937–)
 Anton Pann (1790s–1854), wrote Romania's national anthem and music for the Orthodox Divine Liturgy
 Ion Căianu (1629-1687), the first to record the custom Călușari dance
 Cristian Pațurcă (1964–2011)
 Ionel Perlea (1900–1970), composer and conductor
 Carmen Petra-Basacopol (1926–)
 Ciprian Porumbescu (1853–1883)
 Horațiu Rădulescu (1942–2008), Romanian-French composer of spectral music
 Doina Rotaru (1951–), composer of mainly orchestral and chamber works
 Constantin Silvestri (1913–1969), composer, lived in England
 Matei Socor (1908–1980), composer and musician
 Cornelia Tăutu (1938–), composer best known for film soundtracks
 Octave Octavian Teodorescu (1963–)
 Cornel Trăilescu (1926–), opera composer and conductor
 Anatol Vieru (1926–1998), composer of symphonic, chamber and choral music; winner of Herder Prize in 1986
 Marina Marta Vlad (1949–)
 Roman Vlad (1919–2013), Romanian-born Italian composer, pianist and musicologist

 
Romanian
Composers